Joshua Tyler Neufville (born 22 March 2001) is an English professional footballer who plays as a striker for  club Sutton United on loan from Luton Town.

Career
Born in Luton, Bedfordshire, Neufville started his career with Crawley Green before joining Luton Town's youth system in 2011 as an under-10. He signed scholarship terms in the summer of 2017, before signing a two-year professional contract with the club on 3 September 2018. Neufville made his first-team debut a day later as an 85th-minute substitute for Jorge Grant in a 2–1 home win over Brighton & Hove Albion U21s in an EFL Trophy group stage match.

He joined National League club Solihull Moors on 13 September 2019 on loan until 4 January 2020. He made 13 appearances, scoring once in a Birmingham Senior Cup tie against Boldmere St. Michaels, before being recalled by Luton. Neufville was loaned to another National League club, Woking, on 17 January 2020 for one month.

Neufville was sent out on loan to a National League team for a third time on 1 December 2020, joining Yeovil Town until 9 January 2021. After scoring his first two professional goals in his first two starts for the club, Neufville's loan was extended until the end of the 2020–21 season.

On 18 March 2022, Neufville returned to National League side Yeovil Town on loan until the end of the 2021–22 season. On 14 May 2022, Neufville was recalled by Luton Town from his loan with immediate effect.

On 9 July 2022, Neufville joined League Two side Sutton United on loan until the end of the 2022–23 season.

Career statistics

References

External links
Profile at the Luton Town F.C. website

2001 births
Living people
Footballers from Luton
English footballers
Association football forwards
Luton Town F.C. players
Solihull Moors F.C. players
Woking F.C. players
Yeovil Town F.C. players
Sutton United F.C. players
National League (English football) players
English Football League players
Black British sportspeople